Anand Babu is an Indian actor who was known for his works in Tamil films. He is the son of legendary comedy actor Nagesh.

Career
He first entered the film industry with Tamil films and also played leading roles in Telugu as well as supporting roles. He is also well known for his best dancing abilities. Anand's acting debut was in the Tamil film Thangaikkor Geetham in 1983 directed by T. Rajendar.

He appeared in many films in the early 1990s. Despite his solid beginning in film industry, he has faced a steady decline. He has also acted in some Tamil TV serials.

After long back, he appeared in Aadhavan (2009) directed by K. S. Ravikumar.

Anand Babu appears on the big screen after a long time in Pyaar Prema Kaadhal (2018).

Personal life
He attended School at Campion Anglo Indian  School Trichy and graduated at Loyola college of arts and science Chennai. Anand married Shanthi on 8 December 1985. The couple has three sons and a daughter. Their second son Gajesh is an actor in the Tamil film industry. Their eldest son, Bijesh is an actor.

Filmography

Television

References

External links
 

20th-century Indian male actors
21st-century Indian male actors
People from Tamil Nadu
Living people
Male actors in Tamil cinema
1963 births